Priyadarshini Ram, also known as Priyadharshi Ram  or mononymously as Priyadarshini, is a Singaporean-Indian playback singer who has performed in more than 130 movies in the Tamil, Kannada, Telugu and Hindi cinema industries. She has also sung in devotional and private albums

She began her career as a playback singer by performing a duet song with Hariharan for the Tamil film Kadhal Dot Com, released in 2004. She made her debut in Kannada Films through the movie Ajju for Rajesh Ramanath music. Also sang in Telugu Cinema for D Imman. She sang background vocals in Hindi film Garam Masala starring Akshay Kumar. Later she sung a duet with S. P. Balasubrahmanyam in the Kannada movie Rocky in 2008.

She has worked with music directors such as Bharadwaj, D. Imman, Hamsalekha, Mano Murthy, Gurukiran, R. P. Patnaik, Rajesh Ramnath, K. Kalyan, and S. A. Rajkumar, Mahesh Mahadev, M. N. Krupakar, Ravish and has also recorded jingles and albums.

She holds Bachelor’s degree in Electrical & Electronics Engineering from Nanyang Technological University, Singapore, Master’s degree in Music from the University of Madras and has a PhD in film music from the University of Mysore.

Early life 
Priyadarshini was born in Chennai and grew up in Doha, Qatar and Singapore. Her father Ram is a Chemical Engineer, Tecnicas Reunidas. Her mother Sumathi. At the age of three, she started learning music. When she was four years old, she began singing and took part in singing competitions hosted by radio stations, TV Channels in Chennai and Singapore. During her high school at Yishun Junior College, she won the championship trophy in the tertiary category in Singapore Radio Oli 96.8FM’s Singing competition

Playback songs
This is a partial list of notable films where Priyadarshini has worked as a playback singer.

References

External links

Year of birth missing (living people)
Living people
Women musicians from Tamil Nadu
Singers from Chennai
20th-century Indian singers
Kannada playback singers
Tamil playback singers
Women musicians from Karnataka
Women Hindustani musicians
Telugu playback singers
Singers from Karnataka
Singers from Bangalore
Hindustani singers
Carnatic singers
Sanskrit-language singers
21st-century Indian singers
20th-century Indian women singers
21st-century Indian women singers
Nanyang Technological University alumni
Indian women playback singers